Diya Menon (born 27 December 1992) is an Indian television host and a video jockey who works in Tamil language television. She is known for hosting television shows such as Savaale Samali, Super Challenge and Vanakkam Tamizha. She has also hosted various different private events around India.

Early life
Diya was born in Coonoor, Kerala, India on 27 December 1992 to her father, Muralidharan Menon, and mother, Sindhu Muralidharan Menon. She also has an elder sister called Dheepthi Kapil who is a television actress. She completed her primary education at Mrs. Bullmore School, Coonoor. Then her family relocated to Coimbatore, family. She then completed her schooling at Sri Nehru Vidyalaya, Coimbatore, Tamil Nadu in 2010.

Career 
Diya Menon started her career in 2015 appearing as a television host in the challenge-competition show Super Challenge hosting the show alongside other anchors Deepak Dinkar, Rishi, Aadhavan and Kavitha. She also hosted shows on Sun Music such as Krazy Kanmani, Suda Suda Chennai and Call Mela Kasu. During an interview in 2017, she was asked if she would ever consider debuting as an actress and appearing in films. She replied to the question stating "I have no interest and won't appear in any films".

Personal life
Diya Menon married Karthik Subramanian, a cricketer on a Singapore state-level team. Diya and Karthik were in a three-year relationship before they were married. After marriage Diya and her husband migrated to Singapore for good where she currently resides. She is now a citizen of Singapore. On 20 August 2022, Diya gave birth to a baby girl.

Television

References

External links

 

1992 births
21st-century Indian actresses
Living people
Indian television presenters
Indian women television presenters
People from Kerala
Television personalities from Tamil Nadu
Tamil television presenters